Yarega (Jarega) is an urban locality (an urban-type settlement) under the administrative jurisdiction of the town of republic significance of Ukhta in the Komi Republic, Russia. As of the 2010 Census, its population was 7,806.

Administrative and municipal status
Within the framework of administrative divisions, the urban-type settlement of Yarega, together with two rural localities, is incorporated as Yarega Urban-Type Settlement Administrative Territory, which is subordinated to the town of republic significance of Ukhta. Within the framework of municipal divisions, Yarega is a part of Ukhta Urban Okrug.

References

Notes

Sources

Urban-type settlements in the Komi Republic
